Powerwave Technologies, Inc. was a global telecommunications corporation, with solutions designed to amplify coverage, capacity and data speed in wireless communications networks. Its products supported wireless services worldwide by providing wireless infrastructure such as antennas, base station and coverage systems, covering all major frequency bands and air interfaces to support customers’ existing wireless networks as well as efforts to deploy next-generation 4G WiMAX and LTE systems.

Powerwave Technologies filed for Chapter 11 bankruptcy on 28 January 2013. Powerwave ceased operations by extending the bankruptcy to Chapter 7 on 10 June 2013.

Products
Powerwave's early products were Specialized Mobile Radio "SMR" equipment used by police and fire departments as well as taxi companies. The company also developed products in air-to-ground communication amplifiers that provided telephone services to commercial airline passengers. Powerwave also created the Feedforward Rectified High Power Amplifiers models such as the MCA line of Power Amplifiers.

Customers included wireless OEMs and wireless carriers. Its in-building and outdoor distributed antenna systems were used in public safety and commercial deployments, including skyscrapers, subways, airports and sports arenas.

Acquisitions
Originally operating under the name Milcom International, Inc., the company initially sold radio frequency (RF) power amplifiers for use in analog wireless networks. However, over the past 25 years, Powerwave expanded its business through many acquisitions. In 1999, Powerwave acquired Hewlett-Packard’s RF amplifier business, which was focused on the design and manufacturing of RF amplifiers for cellular, PCS and wireless local loop systems. This acquisition expanded the firm's portfolio in key single carrier markets, such as GSM and TDMA. In 2001, the firm acquired Toracomm Ltd., a UK-based engineering research and development company providing a broad range of RF, digital signal processing (DSP), system design and simulation expertise for 2G, 2.5G and 3G applications. In 2003, the firm acquired Ericsson Amplifier Technologies, Inc., which was focused on multi-carrier power amplifiers. In 2004, the firm acquired LGP Allgon, a global provider of wireless infrastructure equipment and coverage solutions, in order to offer a broader range of products for use in wireless networks worldwide.

In 2005, Powerwave also acquired Kaval Wireless, an Ontario-based company that supplies in-building wireless coverage. This extended the firm's product breadth and market reach in the coverage solutions marketplace with emphasis on the public safety and government markets. Also in 2005, it acquired certain assets of REMEC, Inc.’s Wireless Systems business, including its RF conditioning products, filters, tower mounted amplifiers and RF power amplifiers. It acquired specific product lines from Filtronic's Wireless Infrastructure division in 2006 to include transmit/receive filters, integrated remote radio heads and power amplifier products, all for use in commercial wireless infrastructure base station equipment.

Organization

Office Locations
Powerwave had office locations in 15 countries. The company's Worldwide Headquarters was in Santa Ana, CA 92705.

Company Leadership
Alfonso "Al" Cordero founded the company in Garden Grove California in 1985.  

Bruce C. Edwards served as President from 1996 to 2004, and as Chief Executive Officer from 1996 to 2005.

Ronald J. Buschur was named President and Chief Executive Office in 2005.

Bankruptcy and Recent Events
Powerwave Technologies filed for Chapter 11 bankruptcy on January 28, 2013 with a listed debt of $396M and assets of $213M. As a result of bankruptcy proceedings, Powerwave closed down operations in May 2013. 

In September 2014, Intel announced that it would buy about 1,400 Powerwave patents, mainly relating to wireless communication. The price was not disclosed.

External links
Powerwave Technologies, Inc. company website as archived by archive.org on 28 Aug 2013
Powerwave Technologies, Inc. company summary on Google Finance

References

Companies based in California
Companies formerly listed on the Nasdaq